Scapholeberis is a genus of small freshwater crustaceans in the family Daphniidae. The genus was described in 1858 by Schoedler and its members have a cosmopolitan distribution.

Species 
The genus includes the following species:

 Scapholeberis armata Herrick, 1882
 Scapholeberis duranguensis Quiroz-Vázquez & Elías-Gutiérrez, 2009
 Scapholeberis erinaceus Daday, 1903

References

External links 
 
 

Cladocera